The Bluffton Historic District, located in the town of Bluffton, South Carolina, is important due to its position as the commercial hub of southern Beaufort County from 1880–1930. The area includes 46 buildings of residential and commercial architecture, two landscape features that contribute to the district's historic character, and 17 buildings that do not contribute. Important eras are represented in the district, including the Antebellum Resort Era (1815-1860), Civil War and Reconstruction (1860-1880), and the Commercial Growth and Decline (1880-1945). The Bluffton Historic District was listed in the National Register on June 21, 1996.

References

Queen Anne architecture in South Carolina
Late 19th and Early 20th Century American Movements architecture
Geography of Beaufort County, South Carolina
National Register of Historic Places in Beaufort County, South Carolina
Buildings and structures in Bluffton, South Carolina
Historic districts on the National Register of Historic Places in South Carolina